This was the first edition of the tournament since 2008.

Matthew Ebden won the tournament defeating Denis Kudla in the final, 6–7(4–7), 6–4, 7–6(7–5).

Seeds

 Luca Vanni (first round)
 James Ward (first round)
 Ryan Harrison (quarterfinals)
 Denis Kudla (final)
 Yoshihito Nishioka (quarterfinals)
 Jared Donaldson (second round)
 Yuki Bhambri (first round)
 James McGee (semifinals)

Draw

Finals

Top half

Bottom half

References
 Main Draw
 Qualifying Draw

Aegon Surbiton Trophy - Men's Singles
2015 Singles